Banchory railway station was situated on the Aberdeen and Ballater branch (the Deeside Line). The branch was extended to its final terminus at Ballater in 1866.

The station was reconstructed in 1902, and was substantially built, with stone main buildings and generous platform awnings. There was a goods yard on the down side of the line. The station was host to a LNER camping coach in 1935 and 1936, possibly one for some of 1934 and two coaches from 1937 to 1939. At least part of the station buildings were used to provide camping apartment accommodation for holidaymakers from sometime in the 1950s until the early 1960s, there was accommodation for four people.

By the time of closure all passenger services on the branch were worked by diesel multiple-unit trains, after an experiment with battery-electric railcars in 1958 – 1962. Latterly there were five passenger services in each direction, with an additional train in the summer months. The passenger service was withdrawn from 28 February 1966, and goods services continued until final closure on 18 July 1966.

The Royal Deeside Railway, a heritage line, have established an operating base at Milton of Crathes about three miles east of Banchory, and are working to extend their line into the town.

Routes

References

Disused railway stations in Aberdeenshire
Former Great North of Scotland Railway stations
Railway stations in Great Britain opened in 1853
Railway stations in Great Britain closed in 1966
Beeching closures in Scotland
1853 establishments in Scotland
1966 disestablishments in Scotland
Banchory